The Essex Championships  was a combined men's and women's grass court tennis tournament last held at Frinton Lawn Tennis Club, Frinton-on-Sea, Essex, Great Britain from 1881 to 1973.

History
The Essex Championships were established in 1881 at Brentwood Essex, England  and continued to be staged there until 1884. In 1887 the event was then staged Leyton. It changed location again in 1888 and was held in Chingford till 1889. It switched back to Leyton, Essex for one year only in 1890. From 1891 it moved to the Cambridge Grounds, Colchester where it remained until 1918. Staged briefly at Frinton-on-Sea in 1919 it then moved to Southend-on-Sea until 1922. In 1923 the championships were held at Westcliff-on-Sea till 1946. The championships returned to Frinton-on-Sea and stayed there till the tournament was abolished after seventy five editions in 1973. The event featured both men's and women's singles, doubles and mixed doubles competitions.

Locations
The tournament was staged at different locations during its run the longest at Frinton-on-Sea.

Finals
Notes: Challenge round: The final round of a tournament, in which the winner of a single-elimination phase faces the previous year's champion, who plays only that one match. The challenge round was used in the early history of tennis (from 1877 through 1921)  in some tournaments not all.

Men's singles
Included:

Notes

References

Sources
"Abolition of Challenge Rounds". paperspast.natlib.govt.nz. EVENING POST, VOLUME CIII, ISSUE 65, 20 MARCH 1922.
 Daily Advertiser (Wagga Wagga, NSW : 1911 - 1954). 23 July 1951.
 "Essex Championships, Frinton-On-Sea - WTA Tournaments - Grand Slam History". www.grandslamhistory.com. 2009–2018.
 Kramer, Edited by Max Robertson. Advisory editor: Jack (1974). The encyclopedia of tennis. New York: Viking Press..
 Morris, James; Hegedus, Tomas (2013). "1877 to 2012 Finals Results". www.stevegtennis.com. stevegtennis.
 Nieuwland, Alex. (2009-2017). "Tournament – Essex Championships". www.tennisarchives.com. Harlingen, Netherlands: Idzznew BV.
 Orcutt, William Dana (1897). Official Lawn Tennis Bulletin Volume 4. White Plains, New York, USA: United States Lawn Tennis Association. 
 Sport and Athletics in 1908: An Annual Register Including the Results of the Year 1908 (to November) of All the Important Events in Athletics, Games, and Every Form of Sport in the United Kingdom, Together with the Winners, Records, and Notable Achievements of Past Years ; Also a Full List of Results in the Olympic Games. London, England: Chapman & Hall. 1908.
 Tennis Events". The Illustrated London News Volume 263. London, England: Illustrated London News & Sketch Limited. 1975.
 Warwick Daily News (Qld. : 1919 -1954). 19 July 1949.

Further reading
 Ayre's Lawn Tennis Almanack And Tournament Guide, 1908 to 1938, A. Wallis Myers. 
 British Lawn Tennis and Squash Magazine, 1948 to 1967, British Lawn Tennis Ltd, UK.
 Dunlop Lawn Tennis Almanack And Tournament Guide, G.P. Hughes, 1939 to 1958, Dunlop Sports Co. Ltd, UK
 Lawn tennis and Badminton Magazine, 1906 to 1973,  UK.
 Lowe's Lawn Tennis Annuals and Compendia, Lowe, Sir F. Gordon, Eyre & Spottiswoode
 Spalding's Lawn Tennis Annuals from 1885 to 1922, American Sports Pub. Co, USA.
 The World of Tennis Annuals , Barrett John, 1970 to 2001.

External links
http://www.tennisarchives.com/tournament/Essex Championships
https://www.fltc.co.uk/Frinton Lawn Tennis Club

Grass court tennis tournaments
Defunct tennis tournaments in the United Kingdom
Tennis tournaments in England